The 2010 Akron Zips football team represented the University of Akron during the 2010 NCAA Division I FBS football season. The Zips, led by first-year head coach Rob Ianello, competed in the East Division of the Mid-American Conference and played their home games at InfoCision Stadium – Summa Field. They finished the season 1–11, 1–7 in MAC play.

Schedule

References

Akron
Akron Zips football seasons
Akron Zips football